1636: The Kremlin Games is a novel in the 1632 series written by Gorg Huff and Paula Goodlett along with Eric Flint. It is the fourth book in the series to be listed on the New York Times bestseller list for hardcover fiction. This book reached number 30 on the NY Times list during a single week in June 2012. Besides being listed on the NY Times Best Seller list, 1636: The Kremlin Games was also listed on the Locus Hardcovers Bestsellers List for the month of September in 2012 at number 6.

Plot
The story follows Bernie Zeppi, an  auto mechanic from Grantville, as he travels East to Russia and helps to set in motion various chains of events that leads to fundamental reordering of Russian history and a massive shift from a primarily agrarian economy to a more industrialized one. In writing the review for 1636: The Kremlin Games, the reviewer for the SFRevu wrote a positive review stating that the book "is another side story in the ongoing Grantville saga" and that the "action is carried on by characters that haven't played a significant role in earlier parts of the series" and the book "allowed fans to get involved in the development." The reviewer for the San Francisco Book Review wrote that this book "is a standout even in a wonderful series" and it has "war, political intrigue, romance, [and] even car chases." The Midwest Book Review said that this installment "is an enjoyable thriller with a wonderful second order effect on Bernie and the Russians."

A sequel, 1637: The Volga Rules, was published in 2018.

References

External links
 
 Baen Teacher's Guide to 1636: The Kremlin Games

1632 series books
2012 American novels
American science fiction novels
American alternate history novels
Baen Books books
Books by Eric Flint
Collaborative novels
Novels by David Weber
Fiction set in 1636
Novels set in the 1630s